Matthew Scurfield (born 2 February 1948, in Cambridge, Cambridgeshire) is an English actor and the eldest child of author George Scurfield and his wife Cecilia (née Hopkinson).

His autobiography, I Could Be Anyone, was published in 2008.

Theatre 

Two Gentlemen of Verona (The Duke of Milan / Antonio), The Globe 1996 season;
The Life of Henry the Fifth (The Duke of Exeter), The Globe 1997 season;
A Chaste Maid in Cheapside, (Mr. Yellowhammer), The Globe 1997 season;
The Street of Crocodiles (Father) at the Theatre de Complicite and the National Theatre;
The Trial' (Huld) at the National Theatre;Die Fledermaus (Frosch) with the English National Opera;A Flea in the Ear at the Old Vic;"Apart from George (George) at the National Theatre.

 Television The Sweeney, " Jack Or Knave" (1978) –  Kieran KennedyThe Hitchhiker's Guide to the Galaxy (1981) – Number OneOpen All Hours, 1 episode (1981) – Man from Bus StopEducating Marmalade Atkins (1982) – Sister PurificationThe Secret Adversary (1983) – ConradBulman (1985) – Eddie 'The Snout'Boon (1986) – Sergeant WilsonThe Ruth Rendell Mysteries, 2 episodes (1988) – Will PalmerThe Bill 3 episodes (1988–1990) – Sergeant Coles / NorrisMonster Maker (1989) – VaughnShelley (1990) – SaulA Murder of Quality (1991) – Inspector RigbyBlue Heaven in episode "Pilot" (1992) – JimMinder (1994) – FrankieSharpe's Honour (1994) – El MatarifeWycliffe (1995) – D.S. RinnickPie in the Sky (1996) – Roger HoskinsHetty Wainthropp Investigates (1996) – Oliver HardimanKaraoke (1996) – Impatient patientDangerfield (1996) – Martin RyderCosmic Sucker (1997) – Jack McHineA Dance to the Music of Time (1997) – Major FinnKavanagh QC (1998) – Dr. Ralph Dutton JonesWaking the Dead (2003) – Inspector TynanGame of Thrones, Series 1 Episode 8 (2011) – Vayon Poole

 Film Sweeney 2 (1978) – JeffersonMcVicar (1980) – Streaky JeffriesRaiders of the Lost Ark (1981) – 2nd. NaziThe Jigsaw Man (1983) – KGB man No. 1Nineteen Eighty-Four (1984) – GuardDakota Road (1992) – Bernard CrossBlack Beauty (1994) – Horse DealerLook Me in the Eye (1994) – ClerkAmy Foster/Swept from the Sea (1997) – ThackeryA Different Loyalty (2004) – Anton ZakharovDo Re Mi Fa'' (2016) – Bozo's Conscience

External links 
 Matthew Scurfield website
 

1948 births
Living people
People from Cambridge
English male television actors
English male film actors
English male stage actors
Male actors from Cambridgeshire
20th-century English male actors
21st-century English male actors